Tevfik Kuyas (1916–1989) was a Turkish philatelist who was added to the Roll of Distinguished Philatelists in 1980.

Kuyas was the Royal Philatelic Society London's special representative for Turkey.

He assembled a leading collection of Turkish Tughra stamps from the Brandt, Broadbeck, and Linz collections.

References

External links
http://www.istanbulfilateli.com/hakkimizda.html

Signatories to the Roll of Distinguished Philatelists
1916 births
1989 deaths
Turkish philatelists
Fellows of the Royal Philatelic Society London